Magic for Marigold (1929) is a novel written by L. M. Montgomery. It is an expansion of 4 linked short stories Montgomery wrote and originally published in 1925.

The United States copyright was renewed in 1957.

Synopsis
Marigold Lesley is an imaginative young girl whose father died before she was born. She lives at her paternal relatives' estate, Cloud of Spruce.  Marigold's closest family includes her loving mother, steely Young Grandmother, shrewd Old Grandmother, her Uncle Klon (short for Klondike) who is a former sailor, and her Aunt Marigold, a doctor who saved Marigold's life as a baby. Thanks to the doctor's life-saving skill, the Lesleys decide to name the child Marigold in her honour.

The Cloud of Spruce family make Marigold's life pleasant, if a little dull, but she nonetheless has her share of adventures, fancies and troubles, many related to the peculiar environment she grew up in. Marigold spends much of her childhood playing with her imaginary friend Sylvia, not ignoring other children, but not forming lasting bonds.

The book relates Marigold's seemingly incurable jealousy of her father's first wife, Clementine; an encounter with a Russian princess; several attempts to be "good;" her first romance; and a surprising cooking triumph.

As Marigold grows up she maintains an unabated attachment to Sylvia, which begins to worry her family. But when a boy, nicknamed Budge, moves in next door Marigold learns to enjoy real friendship, and eventually how to share friends with other people. Marigold recognizes her time with Sylvia is not as satisfying as reality. When Sylvia ceases to appear, Marigold mourns but knows that she can move on.

References

External links

 
 Online text of Magic for Marigold (Project Gutenberg)
  L.M. Montgomery's Personal Scrapbooks and Book Covers
 An L.M. Montgomery Resource Page Resource on L.M. Montgomery and her novels
 L.M. Montgomery Online Formerly the L.M. Montgomery Research Group, this site includes a blog, extensive lists of primary and secondary materials, detailed information about Montgomery's publishing history, and a filmography of screen adaptations of Montgomery texts. See, in particular, the page about Magic for Marigold.
 The L.M. Montgomery Literary Society This site  includes information about Montgomery's works and life and research from the newsletter, The Shining Scroll.

Canadian children's novels
1929 Canadian novels
Novels by Lucy Maud Montgomery
Novels set in Prince Edward Island
McClelland & Stewart books
1929 children's books